This list includes Equipment that was formally used by Georgian Armed Forces, Some of listed equipment still could be is reserve or used for Ceremonial purposes.

Small arms

Heavy weapons

Vehicles

Air-defence systems

Aircraft

References

Georgian Army
Military equipment of Georgia (country)